Ryan Thomas Pedon (born May 3, 1978) is an American basketball coach and former player. He is currently the head coach at Illinois State. He is known for his Ohio roots and strong recruiting. He has been a coach under notable names like John Groce and Chris Holtmann.

Playing career

Pedon played college basketball for Wooster under head coach Steve Moore. He won the Bear Award in 2000 for a player who exhibits leadership, courage and character to the team.

He graduated in 2000 from Wooster with a degree in communications. In 2002, he earned his master's degree from Miami (OH) in sports organization.

Coaching career

Known for his strong Ohio roots, Pedon started his coaching career at Miami (OH) as a graduate assistant. He became the director of basketball operations for Kent State before returning to Miami (OH) in 2005. While at Miami the second time. He left in 2010 to be an assistant coach under former Marquette assistant coach Tod Kowalczyk.

In 2013, he was hired as the assistant to the head coach by Illinois. He worked under John Groce during this time, a friend of future boss Chris Holtmann. He became known as a good recruiter in the state of Ohio and an offensive-minded coach. In 2015, he joined Chris Holtmann at Butler. He left with Holtmann to join his hometown team, Ohio State, in 2017.  On March 4, 2022 he was announced as the Illinois State men's basketball coach.

Head coaching record

References

1978 births
Living people
Ball State University alumni
Butler Bulldogs men's basketball coaches
College men's basketball head coaches in the United States
Illinois Fighting Illini men's basketball coaches
Illinois State Redbirds men's basketball coaches
Kent State Golden Flashes men's basketball coaches
Miami RedHawks men's basketball coaches
Ohio State Buckeyes men's basketball coaches
Toledo Rockets men's basketball coaches
Wooster Fighting Scots men's basketball players